South Somerset is a local government district in Somerset, England. The South Somerset district covers an area of  ranging from the borders with Devon and Dorset to the edge of the Somerset Levels. It has a population of approximately 162,000. The administrative centre of the district is Yeovil.

A scheduled monument is a nationally important archaeological site or monument which is given legal protection by being placed on a list (or "schedule") by the Secretary of State for Culture, Media and Sport; Historic England takes the leading role in identifying such sites. The legislation governing this is the Ancient Monuments and Archaeological Areas Act 1979. The term "monument" can apply to the whole range of archaeological sites, and they are not always visible above ground. Such sites have to have been deliberately constructed by human activity. They range from prehistoric standing stones and burial sites, through Roman remains and medieval structures such as castles and monasteries, to later structures such as industrial sites and buildings constructed for the World Wars or the Cold War.

There are 69 scheduled monuments in South Somerset. Some of the oldest are Neolithic, Bronze Age or Iron Age including hillforts, such as Kenwalch's Castle and Bowl barrows. The Romano-British period is represented with several sites including the Low Ham Roman Villa which included an extensive mosaic floor, now on display in the Museum of Somerset. Religious sites are represented by Muchelney Abbey, which was probably founded in the 8th century, and Montacute Priory, a Cluniac priory of the Benedictine order, from the 11th. Bruton Abbey was founded by the Benedictines before becoming a house of Augustinian canons. Stoke sub Hamdon Priory was formed in 1304 as a chantry college rather than a priory. More recent sites include several motte-and-bailey castles such as Cary Castle, and church crosses which date from the Middle Ages. Several packhorse bridges, such as Bow Bridge, Plox also appear in the list. The most recent monuments include the Round House, a village lock-up in Castle Cary dating from 1779, and several duck decoys The monuments are listed below using the titles given in the English Heritage data sheets.

Monuments

|}

See also
 Scheduled Monuments in Somerset
 Grade I listed buildings in South Somerset
 Grade II* listed buildings in South Somerset

Notes

References

List
History of Somerset
Scheduled monuments in South Somerset
Somerset, South
Lists of buildings and structures in Somerset